Varadero Point is a point projecting 620 m into Barclay Bay from Robbery Beaches on Byers Peninsula, Livingston Island in the South Shetland Islands, Antarctica and forming the west side of the entrance to Baba Tonka Cove.  Dominated by Varadero Hill (116 m).

The point is named descriptively ('Boathouse Point') from being an area where icebergs get stranded.

Location

Maps
 Península Byers, Isla Livingston. Mapa topográfico a escala 1:25000. Madrid: Servicio Geográfico del Ejército, 1992.
 L.L. Ivanov et al. Antarctica: Livingston Island and Greenwich Island, South Shetland Islands. Scale 1:100000 topographic map. Sofia: Antarctic Place-names Commission of Bulgaria, 2005.
 L.L. Ivanov. Antarctica: Livingston Island and Greenwich, Robert, Snow and Smith Islands. Scale 1:120000 topographic map.  Troyan: Manfred Wörner Foundation, 2009.

References
 SCAR Composite Antarctic Gazetteer.

Headlands of Livingston Island